The 2011 Heineken Open was a men's tennis tournament played on outdoor hard courts. It was the 36th edition of the Heineken Open, and was part of the ATP World Tour 250 series of the 2011 ATP World Tour. It took place at the ASB Tennis Centre in Auckland, New Zealand, from 10 January through 15 January 2011. First-seeded David Ferrer won the singles title.

ATP entrants

Seeds

Other entrants
The following players received wildcards into the singles main draw:
  Nicolás Almagro
  Arnaud Clément
  Michael Venus

The following players received entry into the singles main draw through qualifying:

  Adrian Mannarino
  Bobby Reynolds
  Pere Riba
  Michael Russell

Finals

Singles
 
 David Ferrer defeated  David Nalbandian, 6–3, 6–2
It was Ferrer's first title of the year and 10th of his career. It was his second win at the event, also winning in 2007.

Doubles

 Marcel Granollers /  Tommy Robredo defeated  Johan Brunström /  Stephen Huss, 6–4, 7–6(8–6)

See also
 2011 ASB Classic – women's tournament

References

External links
Official website

 
Heineken Open
ATP Auckland Open
2011 in New Zealand tennis
January 2011 sports events in New Zealand